Dasyandantha is a genus of flowering plants belonging to the family Asteraceae.

Its native range is Venezuela.

Species:
 Dasyandantha cuatrecasasiana (Aristeg.) H.Rob.

References

Asteraceae
Asteraceae genera